Co-firing is the combustion of two (or more) different types of materials at the same time. One of the advantages of co-firing is that an existing plant can be used to burn a new fuel, which may be cheaper or more environmentally friendly. For example, biomass is sometimes co-fired in existing coal plants instead of new biomass plants. Another example is that biomass primary fuel fractions can be cofired with waste-derived fuels in biomass plants leading to an environmentally friendly destruction of waste fractions and cost-effective heat and power production. Co-firing can also be used to improve the combustion of fuels with low energy content. For example, landfill gas contains a large amount of carbon dioxide, which is non-combustible. If the landfill gas is burned without removing the carbon dioxide, the equipment may not perform properly or emissions of pollutants may increase. Co-firing it with natural gas increases the heat content of the fuel and improves combustion and equipment performance. As long as the electricity or heat produced with the biomass and landfill gas was otherwise going to be produced with non-renewable fuels, the benefits are essentially equivalent whether they are cofired or combusted alone. Also, co-firing can be used to lower the emission of some pollutants. For example, co-firing biomass with coal results in less sulfur emissions than burning coal by itself.

Origin 
Co-firing (also referred to as complementary firing or co-combustion) is the combustion of two different fuels in the same combustion system. Fuels can be solid fuels, liquid fuels or gaseous, and its source either fossil or renewable. Therefore, use of heavy fuel oil assisting coal power stations may technically be considered co-firing. However, the term co-firing is used in the present technological framework to designate combined combustion of two (or more) fuels sustained in time, as a normal daily practice.

The interest in co-firing and the use of this term sprung up in the 1980s in the U.S. and Europe, and referred specifically to the use of waste solid residues (paper, plastic, solvents, tars, etc.) or biomass in coal power stations that were designed only for the combustion of coal, and attempted, because of the existence of those new opportunity fuels, to carry out a combined combustion in order to increase benefit margins. This interest in co-firing has grown in the last decade mainly due to increasing social concern about global warming and  greenhouse gas (GHG) emissions. The consequences of this concern are new policies on energy and the environment aimed at reducing emissions. Co-firing is regarded as a great opportunity for replacing coal (solid fossil fuel) used for power generation with renewable fuels (biomass) with lower costs and a direct decrease in greenhouse gas emissions. During the last few decades research has provided very diverse solutions for co-firing biomass in coal power stations with a limited impact on efficiency, operation and lifespan.

In the present context the definition of co-firing could be: The use together of two (or more) fuels,  the primary being fossil and the secondary from another source (renewable or residual), in a boiler originally designed for fossil fuel, either using the original combustion system or additional devices.

Types 
The concept of co-firing is quite simple. It consists in the use of two or more fuels inside the same combustion device. It is applicable to all kind of combustion systems traditionally used for power generation (pulverized fuel, fluidized bed combustion and grate firing). Co-firing in cement kilns is already a quite widespread solution for valorization of waste materials mostly, as well as for biomass. The iron industry (blast furnace) and domestic sector (coal stoves) are also sectors where co-firing could be implemented.

The use of a secondary fuel (biomass or waste) replacing a share of the original fossil fuel may require trivial changes in the facility, or a complete retrofitting with important reforms. Modifications will depend on the characteristics of the fuels, the original combustion technology, the plant layout and the type and location of auxiliary systems. The percentage of original fuel replaced, also known as co-firing rate (either expressed in mass or in energy basis) is furthermore a definitive parameter limiting the technical solutions valid for a specific plant.

The co-firing systems, according to the current state of the art and the future perspectives, can be classified into direct and indirect co-firing technologies. The former refer to those systems where combustion of both fuels takes place at the same combustion device or into the same boiler simultaneously. The secondary fuel (biomass, waste) may be either mixed with coal before the combustion starts or fed by a separate device, e.g. specific biomass burners. Indirect co-firing, on the contrary, separates the combustion of both solid fuels, though Combustion Gasses may be mixed afterwards.

Direct biomass co-firing systems entail advantages of simplicity and economics. However direct co-firing systems are also more sensitive to variations in fuel quality and heterogeneity. Additionally other problems limit the rate of secondary fuel replacing the original fossil fuels. In example ash deposition (fouling and slagging) and corrosion usually increase with the use of biomass and wastes replacing coal, what may shorten the lifespan of diverse devices in contact with Combustion Gasses like superheaters, heat exchangers, selective catalytic reduction (SCR), etc. Direct co-firing systems include next technological solutions:
 Co-milling (in case of solid fuels): blending of primary (coal) and secondary (biomass or waste) fuel, combined milling (in original system) and injection through the coal burners (or feeding system)
 Co-feeding: separate treatment of primary and secondary fuels (milling in case of solid fuels), and incorporation of secondary fuel to the main flow. In case of solid fuels the mixture takes place downstream the coal mill.
 Combined burner: fuels are treated separately (milled in case of solid fuels) and transported to the burner, where primary fuel uses the original ports and secondary fuel uses new ports or unused ducts. In this case, though feeding does not involve fuel physical mixing, combustion stages takes place simultaneously and with similar aerodynamics to original design.
 New burners: fuels use independent feeding lines. Primary fuel uses original injection system, whereas secondary fuel is transported to specific dedicated burners or inlet ports penetrating into the combustion chamber. New burners (injection systems) may replace former burners of primary fossil fuel, or may be installed in new positions in the combustion chamber. This option may involve the use of different combustion systems. For example, in a pulverized coal power station a grate firing system may be installed at the bottom of the combustion chamber, though this solution is rare.

Indirect co-firing systems imply usually more complex and expensive solutions, but they reduce usually problems related with corrosion, fouling, slagging, etc. This, a priori, allows co-firing rates larger than direct systems, that is, larger percentages of coal substituted by biomass or waste. In addition, indirect co-firing systems are in general better for fuel mixtures where secondary fuel may include potential contaminants like heavy metals or other dangerous inorganic compounds.

Main indirect co-firing systems are listed next:
 Separated burning: burning of secondary fuel in a separate boiler or system and introduction of flue gases downstream the radiant section of the original boiler.
 Coupled plant: separate burning in a new boiler specially designed and built for firing the secondary fuel. Original and new system couple their heating fluid circuits. Combustion gases are not mixed and Exhaust gas must be treated separately.
 Gasification systems: the secondary fuel is transformed into gas (with heating value) by means of a gasifier. The resulting syngas is either directly or with a previous treatment, injected in the original combustion chamber or boiler through new dedicated ducts.
 Pyrolysis: biomass is transformed into a mixture of gas, bio-oils and char by means of pyrolysis. Fractions may be separated and introduced into the boiler in different sites.

Advantages of co-firing 
Use of biomass in co-firing incorporate additional environmental, socio-economic and strategy advantages regarding the use of biomass in dedicated biomass plants. In case of waste residues there are no additional benefits, however the combustion of waste may change the emissions regulations to satisfy more strict regulations. For example, limits in emissions from environmental regulations for large scale combustion facilities are more permissive than regulations for incineration plants. Except for the previous drawback related to waste co-firing, the following advantages are common for waste and biomass co-firing:

 Specific investment (per unit of installed power): reduced in comparison with conventional biomass facilities since plant using fossil fuel already exists and only diverse modifications are required
 Power generation with better efficiency: generally biomass power plants produce electricity with relative low efficiency (18 to 22%) compared with the huge coal units (32 to 38%) with optimised cycles given the economy of scale
 Flexible operation: original plant can operate still at 100% load with fossil fuel. Co-firing facility is less sensitive to seasonality in biomass production and to biomass availability and price
 Carrot for development of biomass markets: diverse European countries have proven the promotion of co-firing is a key for the development of biomass markets as well as for the creation of expertise on biomass handling and combustion

External links 
 USDOE United States Department of Energy
EUBIA - European Biomass Industry Association
IEA - International Energy Agency
ACVCOCO Project: Determination of the real potential of greenhouse emissions reduction in Spain by means of the co-firing implementation
CIRCE - Co-firing of low rank coal and biomass: a chance for biomass penetration in the renewables
Janne Kärki et al., Toward Carbon-Negative Power Plants With Biomass Cofiring and CCS

Combustion
Incineration